List of rivers in Puerto Rico (U.S. Commonwealth), sorted by drainage basin and then alphabetically. There are 47 main rivers and 24 lagoons or reservoirs.

There are four slopes through which rainwater flows towards the sea. Due to the generally abundant rain and the flow of its water currents, the most important rivers of Puerto Rico slide down the north slope. Taíno and native people normally built their communities near the rivers. During the Spanish colonization era, the same was true with many pueblos being founded near rivers.

There are about 5,385 miles of river in Puerto Rico; 224 rivers and 553 named streams. Only 8.9 miles of Puerto Rico's rivers have the official U.S. Wild and Scenic River Designation.

Note

A quebrada is a stream.
An arroyo or ensenada is a creek.
A río is a river.
A canal or caño is a channel.
A cayo is a cay.

Reservoirs and lagoons
These are also reservoirs and lagoons in Puerto Rico:

 Guajataca
 Garzas
 Dos Bocas
 Caonillas
 Laguna Tortuguero
 La Plata
 Cidra
 Laguna San José and Laguna Los Corozos
 Carraízo
 Laguna Piñones and Laguna Torrecilla
 Fajardo
 Valenciano (in planning)
 Patillas
 Carite
 Toa Vaca
 Guayabal
 Cerrillos
 Garzas
 Luchetti
 Loco
 Laguna Guánica (drained)
 Laguna Cartagena (refuge)
 Laguna Joyuda
 Casei (in planning)
 El Guineo
 Matrulla

By drainage basin
Rivers of Puerto Rico listed by drainage basin:

North Coast (Atlantic Ocean)

Río Guajataca 
Río Chiquito de Cibao
Río Camuy 
Río Criminales 
Río Piedras
Río Ángeles
Río Grande de Arecibo 
Río Tanamá 
Río Coabey
Río Caonillas 
Río Limón 
Río Yunes 
Río La Venta 
Río Palmarejo 
Río Naranjito
Río Jauca
Río Grande de Jayuya 
Río Zamas
Río Caricaboa 
Río Veguitas
Río Saliente 
Río Salientito
Río de Caguana
Río de Caguanita
Río Viví 
Río Guaonica 
Río Roncador
Río Pellejas 
Río Cidra 
Río de las Vacas
Río Garzas 
Río Saltillo 
Río de la Ciénaga
Río Grande de Manatí 
Río Cialitos 
Río Barbas 
Río Bauta
Río Toro Negro 
Río Matrullas 
Río Culebra  
Río Sana Muerto 
Río Orocovis 
Río Botijas 
Río Cañabón
Río Cibuco 
Río Indio 
Río Morovis 
Río Unibón
Río Mavilla 
Río Corozal 
Río de los Negros
Río Dos Bocas
Río de la Plata 
Río Nuevo
Río Lajas 
Río Bucarabones
Río Cañas 
Río Cuesta Arriba
Río Guadiana 
Río Arroyata
Río Hondo 
Río Caliente 
Río Frío 
Río Usabón
Río de Barranquitas
Río de Aibonito 
Río Matón
Río Guavate
Río Chiquito
Río Cocal
Río Bayamón
Río Hondo 
Río Guaynabo 
Río Minillas 
Río Clavijo 
Río Puerto Nuevo
Río Piedras
Río Grande de Loíza 
Río Canóvanas 
Río Cubuy
Río Canovanillas
Río Cañas 
Río Gurabo 
Río Valenciano 
Río Bairoa 
Río Cagüitas 
Río Cañaboncito
Río Turabo 
Río Cayaguas 
Río de las Vegas
Río Emajagua
Río Herrera
Río Grande (Río El Yunque)
Río Espíritu Santo 
Río Mameyes 
Río de la Mina
Río Sabana 
Río Pitahaya 
Río del Cristal 
Río Camándulas
Río Juan Martín

East Coast (Vieques Passage)

Río Fajardo 
Río Demajagua 
Río Daguao 
Río Santiago
Río Blanco 
Río Cubuy 
Río Icacos
Río Sabana
Río Prieto
Río Antón Ruiz 
Río Humacao 
Río Candelero
Río Guayanes 
Río del Ingenio 
Río Limones
Río Arenas
Río Prieto
Caño de Santiago

South Coast (Caribbean Sea)

Río Loco 
Río Cañas
Río Yauco 
Río Duey
Río Naranjo 
Río Chiquito
Río Guayanilla 
Río Macaná
Río Tallaboa 
Río Guayanés
Río Matilde 
Río Cañas 
Río Pastillo
Río Portugués 
Río Chiquito 
Río Corcho
Río Bucaná 
Río Bayagán 
Río Cerrillos 
Río San Patricio 
Río Prieto
Río Inabón 
Río Guayo
Río Anón
Río Jacaguas 
Río Toa Vaca 
Río Cañas 
Río Descalabrado 
Río Coamo 
Río de la Mina 
Río del Pasto
Río Cuyón 
Río Cayures
Río Jueyes 
Río Nigua (Río Salina)
Río Majada 
Río Lapa 
Río Jájome 
Río Seco 
Río Guamaní
Río Nigua
Río Grande de Patillas 
Río Marín
Río Chico
Río de Apeadero 
Río Jacaboa
Río Maunabo 
Río Lachi

West Coast (Mona Passage)

Río Culebrinas 
Río Cañas 
Río Guatemala 
Río Juncal 
Río Guayabo
Río Culebra
Río Ingenio
Río Grande 
Río Hondo
Río Grande de Añasco 
Río Dagüey
Río Cañas 
Río Casei 
Río Humata
Río Sonador
Río Arenas
Río Guabá 
Río Bonelli 
Río Postrero
Río Blanco 
Río Guilarte 
Río Limaní
Río Yahuecas
Río Prieto 
Río Toro 
Río Sapo
Río Yagüez
Río Guanajibo 
Río Hondo
Río Rosario 
Río Prieto
Río Maricao 
Río Viejo 
Río Hoconuco 
Río Duey
Río Nueve Pasos 
Río Caín 
Río Cupeyes 
Río Cruces 
Río Flores 
Río Grande 
Río Coco

Alphabetically

Caño de Santiago
Río Ángeles
Río Anón
Río Antón Ruiz
Río Arenas (Las Marías)
Río Arenas (Yabucoa)
Río Arroyata
Río Bairoa
Río Barbas
Río Bauta
Río Bayagán
Río Bayamón
Río Blanco
Río Bonelli
Río Botijas
Río Bucaná
Río Bucarabones
Río Cagüitas
Río Caín
Río Caliente
Río Camándulas
Río Camuy
Río Cañabón
Río Cañaboncito
Río Cañas
Río Candelero 
Río Canóvanas
Río Canovanillas
Río Caonillas
Río Caricaboa
Río Casei
Río Cayaguas
Río Cayures
Río Cerrillos
Río Chico
Río Chiquito (Yauco, Puerto Rico)
Río Chiquito de Cibao
Río Chiquito
Río Cialitos
Río Cibuco
Río Cidra
Río Clavijo
Río Coabey
Río Coamo
Río Cocal
Río Coco
Río Corcho
Río Corozal
Río Criminales
Río Cruces
Río Cubuy (Loiza)
Río Cubuy (Naguabo)
Río Cuesta Arriba
Río Culebra (Aguada)
Río Culebra (Orocovis)
Río Culebrinas
Río Cupeyes
Río Cuyón
Río Daguao
Río Dagüey
Río de Aibonito
Río de Apeadero
Río de Barranquitas
Río de Caguana
Río de Caguanita
Río de la Ciénaga
Río de la Mina (Coamo)
Río de la Mina (Río Grande)
Río de la Plata
Río de las Vacas
Río de las Vegas
Río del Cristal
Río del Ingenio
Río del Pasto
Río Demajagua
Río Descalabrado
Río Dos Bocas
Río Duey
Río Emajagua
Río Espíritu Santo
Río Fajardo
Río Flores
Río Frío
Río Garzas
Río Grande
Río Grande de Añasco
Río Grande de Arecibo
Río Grande de Jayuya
Río Grande de Loíza
Río Grande de Manatí
Río Grande de Patillas
Río Guabá
Río Guadiana
Río Guajataca
Río Guamaní
Río Guanajibo
Río Guaonica
Río Guatemala
Río Guavate
Río Guayabo
Río Guayanes
Río Guayanilla
Río Guaynabo
Río Guayo
Río Guilarte
Río Gurabo
Río Herrera
Río Hoconuco
Río Hondo
Río Humacao
Río Humata
Río Icacos
Río Inabón
Río Indio
Río Ingenio
Río Jacaboa
Río Jacaguas
Río Jájome
Río Jauca
Río Juan Martín
Río Jueyes
Río Juncal
Río La Venta 
Río Lachi
Río Lajas
Río Lapa
Río Limaní
Río Limón
Río Limones
Río Loco
Río Macaná
Río Majada 
Río Mameyes
Río Maricao
Río Marín
Río Matilde
Río Matón
Río Matrullas
Río Maunabo
Río Mavilla
Río Minillas
Río Morovis
Río Naranjito
Río Naranjo
Río Nigua (Arroyo)
Río Nigua (Salinas)
Río Nueve Pasos
Río Nuevo
Río Orocovis
Río Palmarejo
Río Pastillo
Río Pellejas
Río Piedras
Río Pitahaya 
Río Portugués
Río Postrero
Río Prieto (disambiguation)
Río Puerto Nuevo
Río Roncador
Río Rosario
Río Sabana
Río Saliente
Río Salientito
Río Saltillo
Río San Patricio
Río Sana Muerto
Río Santiago
Río Sapo
Río Seco
Río Sonador
Río Tallaboa
Río Tanamá
Río Toa Vaca
Río Toro Negro
Río Toro
Río Turabo
Río Unibón
Río Usabón
Río Valenciano
Río Veguitas
Río Viejo
Río Viví
Río Yagüez
Río Yahuecas
Río Yauco
Río Yunes
Río Zamas

See also

 List of rivers in U.S. insular areas
 List of rivers of Ponce, Puerto Rico
 List of cays and islets of Puerto Rico

References

External links
 USGS Hydrologic Unit Map – Caribbean Region (1974)
 USGS Geographic Names Information Service
 Rios de Puerto Rico
 River Basins in Puerto Rico 
 Guia de Saltos y Caidas de Agua de Puerto Rico. Gobierno de Puerto Rico. Departamento de Recursos Naturales y Ambientales. Division del Monitoreo del Plan de Aguas, Secretaria Auxiliar de Planificacion Integral.  San Juan, Puerto Rico. Carmen R. Guerrero Pérez, Secretaria Estatal del Departamento de Recursos Naturales y Ambientales. Edited by Ivelisse Pérez Rodríguez, Nervalis Medina Echevarría, Aurielee Díaz Conde, and Marianela Torres Rodríguez. 2016. 181 pages. Archived.

Rivers
P
Puerto Rico